WSPG (1400 AM) is a radio station licensed to Spartanburg, South Carolina. It is owned by Ryan Delaney, through licensee Fox Sports Spartanburg 2 LLC. The WSPG studios and transmitter are located at 340 Garner Road in Spartanburg.

History
The station signed on the air September 1, 1952. In the 1970s WKDY was first owned by Capitol Broadcasting Corporation until the late 70s.  In 1991 the station was purchased and went back on air as WYYR and was owned by some of the former employees of WORDTony Brooks, Bobby Dean and Todd Brown. It was later purchased by T.C. Lewis and Todd Brown who operated several different formats in the 1990s.  During this time, the station was known as Spartanburg's only locally owned community station. Brown sold his interest to Lewis. Lewis sold the station to Matthew Fulmer in 2003 who changed formats to brokered religious programming.  The station was sold again in 2006.  On January 11, 2010, the station began simulcasting on 97.1 FM until Jan 2014. The Station was sold to FOX Sports Spartanburg 2 On February 16, 2017. 98.3 FM Started Simulcast WSPG AM This was done to help cancel out the AM signal that is reduced significantly at night, as well as provide better audio quality.

On January 11, 2014 WSPG ESPN 1400 was Knock off the air due to Tower collapse

On February 1, 2016 it was announced that WSPG AM 1400 was coming back on the air as Fox Sports 1400 Spartanburg; the station returned to the air with that format on February 10.
On February 10, 2016 WSPG 1400 signed back on the air as Fox Sports 1400 Spartanburg 

On November 14, 2016, the station received a construction permit from the FCC to build an FM translator at 98.3 MHz.

Programming
ESPN Spartanburg was run by Matt Smith, known as "Smitty" on air. Smith worked at the station before the change to an all sports format. He created and co hosted what is now known as Open Mic Daily, the station's weekday afternoon sports call in show. In May 2012 Smith took over operations of the station from Mark Hauser, who had served as President and General Manager.  Hauser is the long time "Voice of the Wofford College Terriers" and one of the co-hosts of Open Mic Daily.  Hauser is also well known as the former voice of the Greenville Braves.  Ryan Clary is co-host of Open Mic Daily. Clary is the voice of the Spartanburg Vikings and the Presbyterian College Blue Hose.

Bump and Run is Spartanburg County's only locally produced morning show.  Bump and Run airs weekday mornings from 7am-9am. The current host for the show is Tyler Shugart.  Tyler formally hosted a radio show at WBCU in Union and called games for Union County High School. Tyler also is a contributing columnist for the Union Times.

On February 17, 2021 Fox Sports Spartanburg 1400 am & 98.3FM Announce that they will be airing the Atlanta Braves Baseball 

The station airs locally produced sports shows plus national programming and live sporting events from Fox Sports Radio. Fox Sports 1400 Spartanburg also carries live sports from the following teams:

Sports teams
South Carolina Gamecocks Baseball & Football
Spartanburg High School Viking Football
Presbyterian College  Blue Hose Football
Atlanta Braves Radio Network  Atlanta Braves

References

External links
WSPG official website
WSPG AM 1400 Tune-in app

Sports radio stations in the United States
SPG
Radio stations established in 1952
1952 establishments in South Carolina
Spartanburg, South Carolina
Fox Sports Radio stations